Amy Hunter can refer to:

 Amy Hunter (actress)
 Amy Hunter (cricketer)